Aaron Becker (born 1974) is an American writer and illustrator of children's books.  He is best known for his wordless children's book Journey, which received positive reviews in the New York Times and the Wall Street Journal and a Caldecott Honor in 2014. 

Quest, the second book in Becker's Journey trilogy, was among a small group of children's books praised by National Public Radio (NPR) in anticipation of the announcement of the 2015 Caldecott Award nominees.  Sam Juliano, in his popular Wonders in the Dark blog, also remarked on Quest'''s likelihood of Caldecott attention.

The final book of the trilogy, Return, was released in August 2016. Among the many publications reviewing the book were the Financial Times on 19 August 2016 and the New York Times on 26 August 2016.

Becker published "A Stone for Sascha" in May 2018. The book was reviewed by the New York Times Book Review, Kirkus Reviews, Publishers Weekly, The Boston Globe, et al.

Prior to his children's book work, Becker illustrated scenes in children's animated films, including The Polar Express (2004), Cars (2006), Monster House (2006), Beowulf, and A Christmas Carol.

Biography 
Becker was born and raised in Baltimore, Maryland. He attended Baltimore City College High School. He graduated from Pomona College in 1996, and currently lives and works in Amherst, Massachusetts.

Published works 
Journey Trilogy (Candlewick Press)
Book 1: Journey (August 2013) 
Book 2: Quest (August 2014) 
Book 3: Return (August 2016) 
A Stone for Sascha (May 2018)

References

External links
 Storybreathing - Aaron Becker's official site
 Slideshow of Polar Express artwork
 Animatic developed for title sequence of Polar Express
 Official release trailer for Journey
 The Making of Journey
 Official release trailer for Quest

Living people
American children's writers
American children's book illustrators
Artists from Baltimore
Writers from Baltimore
1974 births
Pomona College alumni
Writers from Amherst, Massachusetts
Artists from Massachusetts